Robert Shapiro (28 November 1935 – 15 June 2011) was professor emeritus of chemistry at New York University. He is best known for his work on the origin of life, having written two books on the topic: Origins, a Skeptic’s Guide to the Creation of Life on Earth (1986) and Planetary Dreams (1999). He opposed the RNA world hypothesis, and held that the spontaneous emergence of a molecule as complicated as RNA is highly unlikely. Instead, he proposed that life arose from some self-sustaining and compartmentalized reaction of simple molecules: "metabolism first" instead of "RNA first". This reaction would have to be able to reproduce and evolve, eventually leading to RNA. He claimed that in this view life is a normal consequence of the laws of nature and potentially quite common in the universe.

Works
Life Beyond Earth: The Intelligent Earthling's Guide to Extraterrestrial Life (with Gerald Feinberg) Morrow, 1980. .
Origins: A Skeptic's Guide to the Creation of Life on Earth Summit Books (January 1986) .
Planetary Dreams: The Quest to Discover Life Beyond Earth Wiley; 1 edition (1999) .

References

External links
 Faculty page at New York University
 Page about his books

1935 births
2011 deaths
American chemists
New York University faculty
Harvard University alumni
City College of New York alumni